is a private junior college in Nisshin, Aichi, Japan. It was established in 1982.

See also 
 List of junior colleges in Japan

External links
  

Japanese junior colleges
Universities and colleges in Aichi Prefecture